"Ooo Baby Baby" is a song written by Smokey Robinson and Pete Moore. It is a classic 1965 hit single by The Miracles for the Tamla (Motown) label. 
The song has inspired numerous other cover versions by other artists over the years, including covers by Ella Fitzgerald, Todd Rundgren, The Escorts, The Five Stairsteps, Linda Ronstadt, and many others. The Miracles' original version of "Ooo Baby Baby" is listed as number 266 on Rolling Stone Magazine's list of "The 500 Greatest Songs of All Time".

The Miracles original version

Background
Written by Robinson and fellow Miracle Pete Moore and produced by Robinson, "Ooo Baby Baby" was a number 4 hit on the Billboard R&B singles chart and reached number 16 on the Billboard Hot 100.

A slow, remorseful number, "Ooo Baby Baby" features Miracles lead singer Smokey Robinson lamenting the fact that he cheated on his woman, and begging for her to overlook his mistakes and please forgive him. The song's highly emotional feel is supported by the Miracles' tight background vocal harmonies, arranged by Miracles member and song co-author Pete Moore, and a lush orchestral string arrangement that accents The Funk Brothers band's instrumental track.

Cash Box described it as "a medium-paced, low-down, pop-r&b ode about an unfortunate gal whose singin’ the blues since she lost her guy."

In 2004, Rolling Stone ranked the Miracles' original version of this song as #266 on their list of The 500 Greatest Songs of All Time. The song is one of the Miracles' most-covered tunes.
 
On the 2006 Motown DVD The Miracles' Definitive Performances, Pete comments on the song's creation: 
"In the songs that Smokey and I wrote together, Smokey and Berry kinda left the background vocals to me. And this song "I'm On The Outside (Looking In)", which was one of The Imperials'  bigger hits.... When I heard that song,  as far as the background (harmonies) were concerned and how (they were structured),  I wanted to get the same kind of feeling with Smokey's vocal. So I called Bobby, Ronnie, and Claudette over, and we did the backgrounds for it.  I kinda had that particular song in mind...so I wanted to get the same kind of feeling with 'Ooo Baby Baby'."

Influence
John Lennon was a huge fan of Smokey Robinson; he borrowed the "I'm Crying" part in this song for The Beatles' song "I Am the Walrus".

Chart performance

Weekly charts

Year-end charts

Personnel

The Miracles

William "Smokey" Robinson – writer, producer, lead vocals
Pete Moore – writer, vocal arrangements, background vocals
Claudette Rogers Robinson – background vocals
Ronnie White – background vocals
Bobby Rogers – background vocals
Marv Tarplin – guitar

Other credits
 Detroit Symphony Orchestra – strings
 The Funk Brothers – other instruments, featuring Jack Ashford on vibraphone

Linda Ronstadt version

Background
In 1978, Linda Ronstadt recorded a cover version of "Ooh Baby Baby" and included it on her double-platinum album Living in the USA. Her version of the single reached number 2 on the Contemporary chart and peaked at number 7 on the Billboard Hot 100 in 1979 (it also hit the R&B and Country singles charts). Her single, which opens with a saxophone solo by David Sanborn, was produced by Peter Asher and issued on Asylum Records. Ronstadt performed with Smokey Robinson both "The Tracks of My Tears" and "Ooh Baby Baby" on the Motown 25: Yesterday, Today, Forever special broadcast on May 16, 1983.

Chart performance

Weekly charts

Year-end charts

Other versions
The Five Stairsteps (1967)
Ella Fitzgerald  (1969)
The Fuzz on The Fuzz (1970)
San Francisco T.K.O.'s on Herm b/w Oh Baby, Baby (1972)
Honey Cone on Love, Peace & Soul as "O-O-O Baby Baby" (1972)
Todd Rundgren on A Wizard, a True Star (1973)
Ralfi Pagan on  I Can See  (1975)
Gary Bartz on Music Is My Sanctuary (1977)
Shalamar on Uptown Festival (1977)
Aretha Franklin and Smokey Robinson performed the song on Soul Train on December 1, 1979.
Sylvester on Too Hot to Sleep (1981)
Zapp, titled "Ooh Baby Baby", on Zapp Vibe (1989), also released as a single
Hugh Masekela, Uptownship (1989)
Ray, Goodman & Brown, titled "Ooh Baby Baby", on Ray, Goodman & Brown Live (1992)
Janet Kay on For the Love of You  (1994)
Laura Nyro (recorded 1994/95) released on Angel in the Dark in 2001
Yoko Takahashi (1996)
LaToya London (2004) on American Idol during Motown Week
Musiq on Luvanmusiq  (2007, bonus track)
Human Nature on Get Ready (2007) featuring Smokey Robinson.
Anoop Desai (2009) on American Idol during Motown Week
Marianne Faithfull featuring Antony Hegarty (2009) released on Easy Come, Easy Go
Seal, titled "Ooh Baby Baby," on Soul 2 (2011)
Teena Marie, bonus digital track on her posthumous album Beautiful (2013)
Erich Cawalla on "The Great American Songbook" (2022)

References

External links 
 List of cover versions of ”Ooo Baby Baby” at SecondHandSongs.com

1965 songs
1965 singles
1979 singles
1989 singles
Songs written by Smokey Robinson
Songs written by Warren "Pete" Moore
The Miracles songs
Linda Ronstadt songs
The Fuzz (band) songs
Songs about loneliness
Song recordings produced by Smokey Robinson
Tamla Records singles
Asylum Records singles
Songs about infidelity
Torch songs
1960s ballads